Amparo Galindo is a Spanish chemist who is Professor of Chemical Engineering at Imperial College London. She is the co-director of the Institute for Molecular Science and Engineering. Her research considers the development of statistical mechanics and simulations to understand industrial processes. She was awarded the 2023 Institution of Chemical Engineers Guggenheim Medal.

Early life and education 
Galindo studied chemistry at the Complutense University of Madrid. She moved to the University of Sheffield for doctoral research, where she studied physical chemistry. Her research used the statistical associating fluid theory to understand phase equilibria in associating systems. She spent a year at British Petroleum before joining Delft University of Technology as a postdoctoral fellow. In 1999, Galindo joined the University of Patras, where she worked on liquid crystals.

Research and career 
Galindo was made an Engineering and Physical Sciences Research Council Advanced Research Fellow at Imperial College London in 2000. She was made a lecturer in 2002 and a professor in 2011. She is interested in the development of statistical mechanics to understand industrially relevant chemistry. In particular, she looks to understand complex phase behaviour in supercritical separations, polymers and liquid crystals. She has developed the SAFT-γ Mie approach to predict the solubility of active pharmaceutical ingredients in solvents in mixed environments. This is recognised as the most accurate tool for property prediction in complex fluids as it accounts for hydrogen bonding and electrostatic interactions. She was made the Lilly Chair in Pharmaceutical Molecular Systems in 2018. This role saw her develop complex simulations to revolutionise drug discovery.

In 2023, Galindo was awarded the Institution of Chemical Engineers Guggenheim Medal for her work in thermodynamics and complex fluids.

Selected publications

References 

Year of birth missing (living people)
Living people
Complutense University of Madrid alumni
Alumni of the University of Sheffield
Academics of Imperial College London
Spanish women chemists
Spanish emigrants to the United Kingdom
20th-century Spanish women scientists
21st-century Spanish women scientists
20th-century Spanish scientists
21st-century Spanish scientists
20th-century chemists
21st-century chemists